Elections to Barnsley Metropolitan Borough Council were held on 1 May 1980, with one third of the council up for election. Labour retained control of the council.

Election result

This resulted in the following composition of the council:

Ward results

+/- figures represent changes from the last time these wards were contested.

By-elections between 1980 and 1982

References

1980 English local elections
1980
1980s in South Yorkshire